Plagiolepis ampeloni is a species of ant in genus Plagiolepis. It is native to Austria.

References

Formicinae
Endemic fauna of Austria
Hymenoptera of Europe
Insects described in 1969
Taxonomy articles created by Polbot